The Southeast Asian Linguistics Society (SEALS) is a linguistic society dedicated to the study of languages and linguistics in mainland and insular Southeast Asia. It was founded in 1991 by Martha Ratliff and Eric Schiller. Paul Sidwell is currently president.

Journal

The Journal of the Southeast Asian Linguistics Society is the society's peer-reviewed open-access academic journal covering research on the languages of mainland and insular Southeast Asia, including Sino-Tibetan, Austroasiatic, Kra-Dai, Hmong-Mien, and Austronesian languages. It was established in 2009 and is published by the University of Hawaii Press. The editor-in-chief is Mark Alves (Montgomery College).

The journal was formally established at the SEALS 17 meeting in September 2007 at the University of Maryland. It supersedes the SEALS Conference Proceedings, which were published by Arizona State University. The first volume was published in 2009. The journal uses a Creative Commons License.

Conferences
The society holds annual conferences generally in late May. Usually, 50–100 papers are presented in 2–3 days. Papers and presentations are archived online, with the exception of some earlier conferences. SEALS conferences have been held since 1991.

See also
List of linguistics conferences
List of linguistics journals

References

External links

Former official website (jseals.org)
Journal page at University of Hawaiʻi
Archive of all volumes (open access)
Volumes 1-9 (open access at Australian National University)

Linguistic societies
Organizations established in 1991
Languages of Southeast Asia